Ron Marshall is American politician and a  Republican member of the Montana House of Representatives from the 87th district. Elected in November 2020, he assumed office on January 4, 2021.

Career 
Marshall served in the United States Army from 1982-1996. He has since owned and operated small businesses in Victor, Montana. Marshall is the vice president of the Montana Smoke Free Association and vice-chair for public relations the Ravalli County, Montana, Republican Central Committee. Marshall was elected to the Montana House of Representatives in November 2020 and assumed office on January 4, 2021, succeeding Nancy Ballance.

References 

Living people
Republican Party members of the Montana House of Representatives
People from Ravalli County, Montana
21st-century American politicians
1962 births